Kenney may refer to:

 Kenney (name)

Places

United States communities 
 Kenney, Illinois
 Kenney, Texas

Geographical features 
 Hotel Kenney, Rideau Lakes, Ontario, Canada
 Kenney Dam, a  hydroelectric dam on the Nechako River, British Columbia, Canada
 Kenney Glacier, Trinity Peninsula, Antarctica
 Kenney Nunatak, a nunatak rising in Waddington Glacier, Antarctica
 Mount Kenney, a sharp summit in the Cathedral Peaks, Prince Olav Mountains, Antarctica

See also
 
 Kenn (disambiguation)
 Kennedy (disambiguation)
 Kenny (disambiguation)
 Kinne (disambiguation)
 Kinnie (disambiguation)
 Kinney (disambiguation)